"You Mean the World to Me" is a song written by Billy Sherrill and Glenn Sutton, and recorded by American country music artist David Houston. It was released in August 1967 as the first single and title track from the album You Mean the World to Me. The song was Houston's third number one on the country charts as a solo artist. The single spent two weeks at number one and a total of sixteen weeks on the chart.

Chart performance

References

David Houston (singer) songs
1967 singles
Songs written by Billy Sherrill
Songs written by Glenn Sutton
Song recordings produced by Billy Sherrill
Epic Records singles
1967 songs